The 2013 Svenska Cupen final was played on 26 May 2013. The match was played at the national stadium Friends Arena in Solna which was completed in November 2012 and hosted the final for the first time. The final made its return to Solna for the first time since 2009 and it was also be the first time since 2006 that the final was played at a neutral venue. The final was the culmination of the 2012–13 Svenska Cupen, and the first time since 2001 that the final was held in springtime. Allsvenskan clubs Djurgårdens IF and IFK Göteborg contested the 2013 final. In Sweden the match was televised live on SVT.

IFK Göteborg won their sixth Svenska Cupen title after defeating Djurgården 3–1 on penalties after the match had finished 1–1 after extra time.

Background
The match was Djurgården's eight final and IFK Göteborg's eleventh. Djurgården latest final appearance was in 2005 when they defeated Åtvidabergs FF 2–0 at Råsunda. IFK Göteborg latest final appearance was in 2009 when they lost 2–0 to AIK at Råsunda, ending a dramatic season between the two teams as AIK won the double that year, having finished four points ahead of IFK Göteborg after defeating them at Gamla Ullevi and clinching the league title in the last fixture of the season a week before the cup final. Before that IFK Göteborg had won the 2008 Svenska Cupen.

At the time of the final 10 rounds of the 2013 Allsvenskan league season had been played. IFK Göteborg got off to a good start of the season and were positioned second in the league table at the time of the final, 13 points ahead of Djurgården who were at 16th place and the bottom team in the league table after a rough start of the season. Djurgården changed managers just weeks before the cup final as previous manager Magnus Pehrsson resigned on 26 April after threats from the club's supporters. Norwegian manager Per-Mathias Høgmo was appointed on 15 May, just 11 days before the final. Høgmo had only been in charge for two league matches before the cup final.

The teams had previously faced each other once before in a Svenska Cupen final. This was in the 2004 Svenska Cupen final, that match was won by Djurgården with a 3–1 score at Råsunda.

Road to the Final

Note: In all results below, the score of the finalist is given first.

Match
The match was delayed for several minutes due to pyrotechnics and flares being set off by supporters from both teams which created a large smoke screen across the pitch. The teams were led back into the tunnel to wait for the smoke to clear. Kick-off was held at 17:16 instead of 17:00. The Swedish national anthem was sung before the start of the match.

Details

Statistics

See also
2012–13 Svenska Cupen

References

External links
Svenska Cupen at svenskfotboll.se

2013
Cupen
Djurgårdens IF Fotboll matches
IFK Göteborg matches
May 2013 sports events in Europe
Sports competitions in Solna
Association football penalty shoot-outs